The Pacific First Center is a 16-story high-rise building located at 851 Southwest 6th Avenue in Portland, Oregon, United States. Construction was completed in 1981. The building is owned by Harsch Investment Properties.

References

1981 establishments in Oregon
Buildings and structures completed in 1981
Buildings and structures in Portland, Oregon
Southwest Portland, Oregon